Sääre Nature Reserve is a nature reserve which is located in Saare County, Estonia.

The protected area was founded in 1971 on a basis of Vesitükimaa ornithological conservation area. In 2018 the protected area was designated to the nature reserve.

References

Nature reserves in Estonia
Geography of Saare County